The cifal (meaning the biggest, most senior head, chief or director in Volapük; itself coming from English "chief") is the leader of the Volapük movement. The first cifal was Johann Martin Schleyer until 1889 when he dismissed the entire Academy of Volapük, and the Academy dismissed Schleyer as the cifal and the movement divided between the followers of the cifal and of the Academy. Schleyer, who also held the title of datuval (meaning "the great discoverer" in Volapük) lived until 1912 but before his death left the title to Albert Sleumer who, in 1934, codified the rights and obligations of the cifal.

Typically, the cifal decides on matters of grammar and vocabulary.

The list of cifals is:
 Johann Martin Schleyer 1879–1912
 Albert Sleumer 1912–1948
 Jakob Sprenger  1948–1950
 Johann Schmidt 1950–1977
 Johann Krüger 1977–1983
 Brian Reynold Bishop 1984–2014
 Hermann Philipps 2014–present

External links
 Cifals Volapükas – About cifals in Volapük and English

Volapük
1879 establishments in Germany